George Pilkington can refer to:

 George Pilkington (born 1981), English footballer
 George Pilkington (footballer, born 1926), English footballer
 George Pilkington (painter) (1879–1958), South African painter
 George Augustus Pilkington (1848–1916), English politician